This is a list of symphonic metal bands, including bands that at some point in their career played symphonic metal.

List

A 

 Abigail Williams
 Ad Infinitum
 Adagio
 After Forever
 Agathodaimon
 Alia Tempora
 Almora
 Amberian Dawn
 Ancient Bards
 Anette Olzon
 Angel Nation
 Angra
 Angtoria
 Anorexia Nervosa
 Antestor
 Apocalyptica
 Architects
 Arcturus (earlier works)
 Arthemesia
 Arven
 Atargatis
 Autumn
 Avantasia
 Ayreon

B 

 Bal-Sagoth
 Battlelore
 Believer
 Betraying the Martyrs
 Beyond the Black
 Blind Guardian
 The Black Mages
 Borknagar

C 

 Carach Angren
 Catharsis
 Ceremonial Castings
 Chthonic
 Coronatus
 Cradle of Filth

D 

 The Dark Element
 Dark Moor
 Dark Sarah
 Darkwoods My Betrothed
 Delain
 Devin Townsend Project
 Diablo Swing Orchestra
 Diabulus in Musica
 Dimlight
 Dimmu Borgir
 Divinefire
 Dol Ammad
 Dragonland
 Dragony
 Dreams of Sanity
 Dreamtale

E 

 Edenbridge
 Elis
 Emperor
 Enslavement of Beauty
 Epica
 Eternal Tears of Sorrow
 Evanescence
 Exit Eden
 Eyes of Eden

F 

 Fairyland
 Fightstar
 Fleshgod Apocalypse
 Forest Stream
 Forever Slave
 Forgotten Tales
 Furor Gallico

G 

 Galneryus
 Graveworm
 Gwyllion
 Gloryhammer

H 

 Haggard
 Hanging Doll
 HB
 Headspace
 Heavenly
 Hecate Enthroned
 Herjalf
 Hevein

I 

 Imperial Age
 Indica
 Ice Nine Kills

J 

 Jani Liimatainen

K 

 Kamelot
 Katra
 Kerion
 Kingfisher Sky
 Kobra and the Lotus
 Krypteria

L 

 Labirent
 Lacrimosa (newer works)
 Lana Lane
 Last Days of Eden
 Leah
 Leaves' Eyes
 Limbonic Art
 Luca Turilli
 Luca Turilli's Dreamquest
 Luca Turilli's Rhapsody
 Lunatica
 Lux Occulta
 Lyriel

M 

 Magica
 Magic Kingdom
 Majestica
 Make Them Suffer
 Malice Mizer
 Matenrou Opera
 MaYaN
 Mechanical Poet
 Mechina
 Metalwings
 Midnattsol
 Moi dix Mois
 Moonspell
 Myrath

N 

 Nemesea
 Nightfall
 Nightwish
 Northern Kings
 Nokturnal Mortum

O 

 Opera IX
 Orpharion
 Old Man's Child

P 

 Pathfinder
 Phoenix Rising
 Powerwolf
 Pythia

R 

 ReVamp
 Rhapsody of Fire
 Royal Hunt

S 

 Saille
 Sarah Jezebel Deva
 Satyricon (oldest works)
 Savatage
 Saviour Machine
 Sebastien
 Secret Sphere
 Septicflesh
 Seraphim
 Serenity
 Seventh Wonder
 Shade Empire
 Shadow of Intent
 Shaman
 Sirenia
 Sirrah (earlier works)
 Skyfire
 Skillet
 Sonata Arctica
 Sons of Seasons
 Sound Horizon
 Starkill
 Star One
 Starset
 Stormlord
 Stravaganzza
 Stratovarius
 Stream of Passion
 Summoning
 Susperia
 Suspyre
 Symfonia
 Symphony of Heaven
 Symphony X

T 

 Tarja
 Theatres des Vampires
 Temperance
 Theatre of Tragedy
 Theocracy
 Therion
 Thy Majestie
 Thy Serpent
 Trail of Tears
 Trans-Siberian Orchestra 
 Tristania
 Turilli / Lione Rhapsody
 Turisas
 Tvangeste
 Twilight Ophera
 Twilight Force
 The Sins of Thy Beloved

U 
 Unshine

V 

 Vaakevandring
 Vardøger
 Veni Domine
 Versailles
 Vesania
 Vesperian Sorrow
 Virgin Black
 Virgin Steele
 Visions of Atlantis
 VUUR

W 

 Waltari
 Welicoruss
 Whyzdom
 Wind Rose
 Winds of Plague
 Wintersun
 Within Temptation

X 

 Xandria
 X Japan
 Xerath

See also 
 List of American symphonic metal bands
 Neoclassical metal
 Power metal

References 

Symphonic metal